Tabitha, Stand Up or Tabitha, Arise! (German: Tabea, stehe auf!) is a 1922 German silent drama film directed by Robert Dinesen and starring Lotte Neumann, Maria Forescu and Guido Herzfeld.

The film's sets were designed by the art director Jack Winter.

Cast
 Lotte Neumann
 Maria Forescu
 Guido Herzfeld
 Peter Ihle
 Theo Lucas
 Loni Nest
 Peter Nielsen
 Paul Otto
 Karl Platen
 Dora Schlüter
 Julia Serda
 Walter von Allwoerden
 Hans Heinrich von Twardowski
 Hugo Werner-Kahle

References

Bibliography
 Grange, William. Cultural Chronicle of the Weimar Republic. Scarecrow Press, 2008.

External links

1922 films
Films of the Weimar Republic
Films directed by Robert Dinesen
German silent feature films
German black-and-white films
UFA GmbH films
1922 drama films
German drama films
Silent drama films
1920s German films
1920s German-language films